Hyperolius leleupi is a species of frog in the family Hyperoliidae. It is endemic to the Itombwe Mountains in the eastern Democratic Republic of the Congo. Habitat loss caused by agriculture, livestock and human settlements is likely a threat.

References

leleupi
Endemic fauna of the Democratic Republic of the Congo
Amphibians of the Democratic Republic of the Congo
Taxa named by Raymond Laurent
Amphibians described in 1951
Taxonomy articles created by Polbot